John Fanning may refer to:
 John Fanning (footballer) (born 1948), Australian rules footballer for Essendon
 John Fanning (writer) (born 1973), Irish writer
 John Fanning (Irish politician) (1903–1982), Irish Fianna Fáil politician from Tipperary
 John Fanning (Upper Canada politician) (died 1813), innkeeper, stagecoach operator and politician in Upper Canada
 John H. Fanning (1916–1990), American lawyer and member of the National Labor Relations Board
 John Pat Fanning, member of the West Virginia Senate
 John T. Fanning (1837–1911), American architect